Shibugakitai (The Cool Kid Trio) (シブがき隊) was a Japanese boy band active from 1982 to 1988, composed of three Johnny's idols, Toshikazu Fukawa (Fukkun), Masahiro Motoki (Mokkun), Hirohide Yakumaru (Yakkun). It was launched with a “bad boy” image.

Major casting works

Film
Come On Girls! (Shibugakitai Boys & Girls) (July 10, 1982)
Third-Year High School Boys (December 18, 1982)
Headphone Lullaby (July 10, 1983)
Barrow Gang BC (April 27, 1985)

Awards

|-
| rowspan="3" | 1982
| 13th Japan Music Awards
| Best New Artist
| rowspan="3" | "100%... SO Kamo ne!"
| 
| 
|-
| rowspan="2" | 24th Japan Record Awards
| Best New Artist
| 
| rowspan="2" | 
|-
| New Artist Award
| 
|-
| 1983
| 25th Japan Record Awards
| Golden Idol Award
| "Zokkon Love"
| 
|

References

External links 
 Shibugakitai at Sony Music
 Shibugakitai

Japanese pop music groups
Johnny & Associates
Japanese idol groups
Japanese boy bands
Musical groups disestablished in 1988